Traditional pop (also known as classic pop and pre-rock and roll pop) is Western pop music that generally pre-dates the advent of rock and roll in the mid-1950s. The most popular and enduring songs from this era of music are known as pop standards or American standards. The works of these songwriters and composers are usually considered part of the canon known as the "Great American Songbook". More generally, the term "standard" can be applied to any popular song that has become very widely known within mainstream culture.

AllMusic defines traditional pop as "post-big band and pre-rock & roll pop music".

Origins
Classic pop includes the song output of the Broadway, Tin Pan Alley, and Hollywood show tune writers from approximately World War I to the 1950s, such as Irving Berlin, Frederick Loewe, Victor Herbert, Harry Warren, Harold Arlen, Jerome Kern, George Gershwin and Ira Gershwin, Richard Rodgers and Lorenz Hart, Oscar Hammerstein, Johnny Mercer, Dorothy Fields, Hoagy Carmichael, and Cole Porter.

Mid-1940s to mid-1950s: height of popularity

The swing era made stars of many popular singers including the young Frank Sinatra, Dinah Shore, Jo Stafford, Perry Como, Peggy Lee, Patti Page, and David Whitfield, and Bing Crosby. Two notable innovations were the addition of string sections and orchestral arrangements and more emphasis on the vocal performance. The addition of lush strings can be heard in much of the popular music throughout the 1940s and 1950s. In the early 1950s, as the dominance of swing gave way to the traditional pop music era, many of the vocalists associated with swing bands became even more popular, and were central figures in popular music.

Late 1950s to 1960s: decline
In the late 1950s, rock became a popular and prominent musical style. However, some pop singers who had been popular during the swing era or traditional pop music period were still big stars (e.g., Frank Sinatra, Doris Day, Ella Fitzgerald, Dinah Shore, Dean Martin, and Bing Crosby).

Some of these vocalists faded with traditional pop music, while many vocalists became involved in 1960s vocal jazz and the rebirth of "swing music"; the swing music of the 1960s is sometimes referred to as easy listening and was, in essence, a revival of popularity of the "sweet" bands that had been popular during the swing era, but with more emphasis on the vocalist. Like the swing era, it too featured many songs of the Great American Songbook. Much of this music was made popular by Nelson Riddle and television-friendly singers like Rosemary Clooney, Dean Martin, and the cast of Your Hit Parade.

Many artists made their mark with pop standards, particularly vocal jazz and pop singers like Bing Crosby, Ella Fitzgerald, Billie Holiday, Frank Sinatra, Doris Day, Dean Martin, Frankie Laine, Nat King Cole (originally known as a jazz pianist), Lena Horne, Tony Bennett, Vic Damone, Johnny Mathis, Bobby Darin, Barbra Streisand, Peggy Lee, Sammy Davis Jr., Andy Williams, Nancy Wilson, Jack Jones, Rita Reys, Steve Lawrence, Liza Minnelli and Cleo Laine. Traditional pop had not completely faded from the music scene, even as late as the mid-’60s songs like "The Days of Wine and Roses" and "Moon River" topping the charts and being popular with both teenagers and adults, and in 1959–1960 the hit songs "The Battle of New Orleans (in 1814)" and "North to Alaska" by Johnny Horton were far more popular with teenagers than with adults.

In addition to the vocal jazz and/or 1960s swing music, many of these singers were involved in "less swinging", more traditional, vocal pop music during this period as well, especially Sinatra and Cole.

The diverging tastes between the baby boomers and older Americans of the 1960s led to one of the earliest schisms in music radio. Whereas rock dominated contemporary hit radio (top 40), traditional pop formed the basis of middle of the road (MOR). In terms of 21st century radio formats, the top-40 hits of the 1950s and 1960s are played on oldies stations while the traditional pop hits are the province of adult standards (with some exceptions); due to aging demographics, both formats are fading in popularity in favor of classic hits and gold-based adult contemporary, respectively.

Advent of rock and roll
With the growing popularity of rock and roll in the 1950s, much of what baby boomers considered to be their parents' music, traditional pop, was pushed aside. Popular music sung by such performers as Frank Sinatra, Dean Martin, Ella Fitzgerald, Peggy Lee and their contemporaries was relegated in the 1960s and 1970s to television, where they remained very popular, Las Vegas club acts and elevator music. Dean Martin and Frank Sinatra continued to have many hit singles and albums until the late 60s, however. Nashville country music borrowed heavily from traditional pop sounds in the late 1950s as Music Row sought to limit the growing influence of rock and roll on the genre; it remained popular until both the British Invasion, the deaths of two of Nashville's biggest country stars (Patsy Cline and Jim Reeves) in separate airplane crashes, and the growing influence of West Coast country music pushed it aside beginning in 1964.

In 1983, Linda Ronstadt, a popular female vocalist of the rock era, elected to change direction. She collaborated with legendary arranger-conductor Nelson Riddle and released a successful album of standards from the 1940s and 1950s, What's New. It reached No. 3 on the Billboard pop chart, won a Grammy, and inspired Ronstadt to team up with Riddle for two more albums: 1984's Lush Life and 1986's For Sentimental Reasons. The gamble paid off, as all three albums became hits, the international concert tours were a success and Riddle picked up a few more Grammys in the process. Ronstadt's determination to produce these albums exposed a new generation to the sounds of the pre-swing and swing eras.

Since then, other rock/pop stars have occasionally found success recording traditional pop music. Notable albums include Rod Stewart's It Had to Be You: The Great American Songbook, Willie Nelson's Stardust, Chaka Khan's Echoes of an Era and Carly Simon's Torch.

Revival
The appearance of the lounge subculture in the mid-1990s in the United States helped to enhance the revival and interest in the music, style, and performers of popular music before rock and roll. Many contemporary performers have worked in the style of classic pop and/or easy listening swing.

See also
 Adult contemporary
 Grammy Award for Best Traditional Pop Vocal Album
 Great American Songbook
 Jazz standard
 List of blues standards
 Oldies
 Pop music
 Pops orchestra
 Schlager music
 Sentimental ballad
 Sentimental Journey: Pop Vocal Classics (four-CD album)
 Show tune
 Standard (music)
 Tin Pan Alley

References

External links
 PopularSong.org Online Magazine
 Popular Songwriters and Singers

 
Pop music genres